Ice Harbor Brewing Company is a brewery founded in Pasco, Washington in 1996 by two former workers at the Hanford Site. They entered this venture after buying the Meheen & Collins brewery.

The brewery is located in what was once a grain mill at 206 N. Benton St. in Kennewick, Washington. This building serves as a brewery, and as a brewpub. The menu offers sandwiches and various fare as well as the brewery's creations.  The brewpub recently installed a beer engine, which allows the beer to be pulled from the cask, rather than pushed by carbon dioxide gas.  The brewpub is believed to be the only Tri-City brewpub that uses such a device.

Recently, Ice Harbor Brewing had opened its second pub, which is located at the Port of Kennewick's commercial building at 350 Clover Island Dr. on Clover Island in Kennewick.  The pub opened in late October 2007, and features much of the same brews and fare at the Railroad Avenue brewpub, but without the homebrewing inventory.

The Brewery
The brewery (located at 206 N. Benton St., #C in Kennewick) uses a 10-barrel (bbl) system and uses a single-stage infusion mash system.  The brewery is capable of producing an annual yield of 1300 bbls, both for sale outside the brewery and in the brewpub.

In addition to being a brewery and a brewpub, Ice Harbor also sells homebrewing equipment and supplies. They also provide monthly classes for beginning homebrewers as well as the meeting place for the local homebrew club the Mid-Columbia Zymurgy Association.

The Beers
Ice Harbor Brewing provides a wide variety of handcrafted ales and lagers, all of which have names that reflect the local area.

Columbia Kölsch
This Kölsch beer is brewed in the style of the beers of Cologne, Germany.  Light in color, dry and refreshing. This is one of the company's best sellers.

The Tangerine exBEERience

A hefewiezen beer with added tangerines.

India Pale Ale

A classic ale style, with double the hop rate.

Runaway Red Ale

A red ale, generously hopped with local hops.

Sternwheeler Stout

Closely modeled after the classic Irish stout.  A nitrogen-charged version of this stout is often made available around St. Patrick's Day.

Barley Wine-style beer

A high-gravity ale, hopped heavily to counter the malt sweetness.  Available mostly in the winter months.

Cask-conditioned Hop Warrior
This beer, one of the few offered at the brewpub which is cask-conditioned (their Pale Ale is another), is dry-hopped with Amarillo hops, and is only offered sporadically.

References

External links
Ice Harbor Brewing Company

Food and drink companies established in 1996
Beer brewing companies based in Washington (state)
Pasco, Washington
American beer brands
American companies established in 1996
1996 establishments in Washington (state)